The Virgin Islands Olympic Committee (IOC code: ISV) is the National Olympic Committee representing the United States Virgin Islands.

External links 
 
 U.S. Virgin Islands Olympic Committee

Virgin Islands
Sports governing bodies in the United States Virgin Islands
Virgin Islands at the Olympics
1967 establishments in the United States Virgin Islands

Sports organizations established in 1967